South Africa has a 'hybrid' or 'mixed' legal system, formed by the interweaving of a number of distinct legal traditions: a civil law system inherited from the Dutch, a common law system inherited from the British, and a customary law system inherited from indigenous Africans (often termed African Customary Law, of which there are many variations depending on the tribal origin). These traditions have had a complex interrelationship, with the English influence most apparent in procedural aspects of the legal system and methods of adjudication, and the Roman-Dutch influence most visible in its substantive private law. As a general rule, South Africa follows English law in both criminal and civil procedure, company law, constitutional law and the law of evidence; while Roman-Dutch common law is followed in the South African contract law, law of delict (tort), law of persons, law of things, family law, etc. With the commencement in 1994 of the interim Constitution, and in 1997 its replacement, the final Constitution, another strand has been added to this weave.

Besides South Africa itself, South African law, especially its civil law and common law elements, also forms the basis of the laws of Botswana, Eswatini, Lesotho, Namibia, and Zimbabwe, which were introduced during the process of colonisation. Basutoland (Lesotho) received the law of the Cape Colony in 1884, and Bechuanaland (Botswana) and Southern Rhodesia (Zimbabwe) received it in 1891. Swaziland (Eswatini) received the law of the Transvaal Colony in 1904, and South-West Africa (Namibia) received the law of the Cape Province in 1920, after its conquest by South Africa.

Court system in South Africa 

The South African court system is organized in a clear hierarchy by Chapter 8 of the Constitution of the Republic of South Africa, specifically s166, and consists of (from lowest to highest legal authority):

Firstly, a number of Magistrates' Courts (both smaller Regional and larger District).

Secondly, a single High Court with multiple divisions across the country, both regional (having jurisdiction over the entire province) and smaller local division (having a geographically smaller jurisdiction, usually over a heavily populated regions) introduced by the Superior Courts Act, 2013. This is clearly seen in Gauteng which has both the High Court of South Africa Gauteng Division, Pretoria which sits in Pretoria, and the High Court of South Africa Gauteng Local Division, Johannesburg which sits in Johannesburg. All High Court names have been clarified by the Chief Justice and can be read on page 14 of the South African Government Gazette No. 37390, 28 February 2014.

Thirdly, the Supreme Court of Appeal (SCA), a purely appellate court (court of second instance). While previously both the SCA and Constitutional Court held joint apex jurisdiction/position; the Sixth Amendment of the Constitution of South Africa, altered the hierarchy so that the Constitutional Court sitting in Johannesburg is the apex court, with the SCA below it, and the High Court below the SCA.

And finally, the Constitutional Court, which is the highest authority in constitutional matters, and since the Sixth Amendment of the Constitution of South Africa, the highest court in the land for both constitutional matters and all other matters. This position is legally confirmed and constitutionally entrenched by Section 167(3)(b)(ii) of the Constitution of South Africa which states that the Constitutional Court may decide "any other matter, if the Constitutional Court grants leave to appeal on the grounds that the matter raises an arguable point of law of general public importance which ought to be considered by that Court". The Constitutional Court has final authority to decide whether an issue is constitutional or not; s167(3)(c) of the Constitution of South Africa.

A number of specialized courts have also been created by legislation to deal with specialized areas of law important to the public as well as to avoid a backlog in the main legal administration infrastructure. These courts exist alongside the court hierarchy; their decisions are thus subject to the same process of appeal and review through the normal courts, starting at a specific level depending on the specialized court in question. Within these specialized courts, there exist, to name a few, the Competition Appeal Court, the Electoral Court, the Land Claims Court, and the Labour and Labour Appeal Court.
 
African indigenous courts, which deal exclusively with the indigenous law, also exist. A draft Traditional Courts Bill aimed at introducing a Traditional Court below, or on the same level as the Magistrates Courts has been drafted, but awaits parliamentary introduction, reading and debate.

History

The Roman-Dutch period (1500–1809)
Until 1795, the United Provinces of the Netherlands was a sovereign independent state. Together with the other territories of the Netherlands, it was organised into a fairly free commonwealth informally known as the Dutch Republic. It was originally a rural territory, but the rapid speed of development during the 15th century changed it into a trading centre. Germanic custom, feudal law, and the law merchant were no longer sufficient to settle the disputes which arose in everyday trade, so the Dutch turned to the more advanced ius commune. Initially, it was applied in subsidium to fill in gaps in existing customary law on a case-by-case basis. Then, in the 15th and 16th centuries, it was received in complexu (as a system) to such an extent that at the beginning of the 17th century the great Dutch lawyer Huig de Groot (Grotius) could describe this fusion (or joining together) of Dutch and Roman principles as a "new" mixed legal system with its own content. This was how Roman-Dutch law began, led first and foremost by the doctrinal writers of the Hollandse elegante school. It was later to form the basis of the present common law in South Africa and Sri Lanka in a form that had been expanded by what were called the placaaten which was the legislation of that period.

Prior to 6 April 1652 
With the failure of the indigenous inhabitants as well as the successive Dutch and British colonial governments to record the laws of pre-colonial southern Africa, there is a dearth of information about laws prior to the colonisation of South Africa. However, the current South African legal system has recognised the significance of these, and they have been incorporated into the overall legal system, functioning as district/local courts where appropriate.

6 April 1652 until 1910 
From 6 April 1652 landing of the Dutch in the Cape of Good Hope, the Roman-Dutch legal system and its legislation and laws took increasing hold, holding sway until the Union of South Africa as a dominion of the British Empire was formed on 31 May 1910. Even after this and to date, wherever English law does not stand, Roman-Dutch law forms the bedrock to which South Africa turns in its search for clarity in its law.

31 May 1910 until 1961 
From the union of the Cape Colony, Natal, Transvaal and Orange River Colony in 1910 as a dominion within the British Empire called the Union of South Africa, and prior to the formation of the Republic of South Africa in 1961, much of English law was incorporated into or formed the basis of South African law.  The jury system was abolished in 1969, and cases are decided by a judge alone, sometimes assisted by two assessors. English law and the Roman-Dutch law which held sway prior to this period form the bedrock to which South Africa even now turns in its search for clarity in its law, and where there is a vacuum in its law.

Specific fields of law

See also
 Advocates in South Africa
 Attorneys in South Africa
 In re Dube (1979)
 List of national legal systems
 Legal education in South Africa
 List of law schools in South Africa
 Patent attorney: South Africa

Articles on specific South African legislation

References

Further reading
 Erika de Wet, Holger Hestermeyer, & Rüdiger Wolfrum, eds. The implementation of international law in Germany and South Africa. Pretoria: Pretoria University Law Press, 2015.
 Herman Robert Hahlo & Ellison Kahn. The South African Legal System and Its Background. Cape Town: Juta, 1968 (5th imprint 1985).
 W. A. Joubert et al. The Law of South Africa. Durban: LexisNexis/Butterworths, 2004 .
 Robert Warden Lee. An Introduction to Roman-Dutch Law, 5th edn. Oxford: Clarendon, 1953.
 Ip Maithufi, Sindiso Mnisi Weeks, et al. African Customary Law in South Africa: Post-Apartheid and Living Law Perspectives. Oxford: Oxford University Press, 2015. 
 Lirieka Meintjes-van der Walt. Introduction to South African law: Fresh perspectives. Cape Town: Pearson Education South Africa, 2019.
 C.M. Van der Bank & I. Mulder-De Does. An introduction to South African law and theory, 3rd edn. Vanderbijlpark: Publitech, 2007.
 C.G. Van der Merwe & J.E. Du Plessis. Introduction to the law of South Africa. The Hague: Kluwer Law, 2004.
 Reinhard Zimmermann & Daniel P. Visser. Southern Cross: Civil Law and Common Law in South Africa. Oxford: Clarendon Press, 1996. .
 maritime law
 John Hare. Shipping law & admiralty jurisdiction in South Africa, 2nd edn. Kenwyn: Juta, 2009.
 Patrick H. G. Vrancken. South Africa and the law of the sea. Leiden: Martinus Nijhoff, 2011.
 neighbour law
 Andre J. van der Walt. The law of neighbours. Cape Town: Juta, 2010.

External links